Goa is a 2010 Indian Tamil-language romantic comedy film written and directed by Venkat Prabhu in his third directorial project. Starring his regular cast consisting of Jai, Vaibhav, and Premji along with Aravind Akash, Sampath Raj, Piaa Bajpai, Sneha, and the debutant Australian model Melanie Marie in other roles, the film is the first production of Soundarya Rajinikanth's Ocher Picture Productions. Actors Silambarasan Rajendar, Nayantara and Prasanna make guest appearances in the film, which features music composed by Yuvan Shankar Raja, whilst cinematography is handled by Sakthi Saravanan and the film is edited by K. L. Praveen and N. B. Srikanth.

The film follows the journey of three young men, Vinayagam, Ramarajan and Saamikannu, who flee from their remote, conservative village to escape their overly strict families and travel to the international tourist-destination Goa, after encountering a friend who had fallen in love with a Caucasian girl whilst on holiday there. The film explores their time in Goa, the people they meet ranging from gay hoteliers to suave casino owners, and dwells on the relationships they encounter in the region.

The film, which began pre-production work in August 2008, became highly anticipated before release due to the successes of the director's prior two films Chennai 600028 and Saroja. Filming began in April 2009 and took place in various locations: in the title location of Goa as well as in Pannapuram, Tamil Nadu and Langkawi, Malaysia with the latter being used due to the monsoonal season of Goa, forcing the team to relocate. Before release, the film was given an adult rating by the Central Board of Film Certification, despite much contention from the team with the film also avoiding a court case in regard to the producer's loan. The film released on 29 January 2010 to mostly positive reviews. The film was remade in Kannada language using the same title and released in 2015.

Plot 
The plot begins in a remote village in Tamil Nadu named Pannaipuram. The director Venkat Prabhu wished to the god for the movie to launch. Samikannu (Premgi), the son of a karagattam artist named Karagattakkarar (Shanmugasundaram); Vinayakam (Jai), the son of a military man named Manickam (Chandrasekhar); and Ramarajan (Vaibhav), the son of the local bigwig Nattamai (Vijayakumar) and the village casanova are three rebellious youths who repeatedly attempt to flee their village and see the outside world but are usually caught and punished by the conservative elders. After being punished harshly, they attempt one last escape and succeed. The trio runs away to the town of Madurai, hoping to stay with Vinay's friend Azhagar.

On arriving at Azhagar's place, they find him marrying an American named Angelina Jolie. Azhagar tells them that he had met her in Goa months ago and they fell in love. He tells the trio that they will spend their honeymoon in London and after that he will be moving over to London as his father-in-law has secured him a nice job there. The three friends are inspired to travel to Goa, meet a foreign woman there, and marry her to escape from their miserable life in India. The next day, on finding out that Samikannu had mistakenly brought along a pile of sacred golden jewels from their village temple and thus the 3 can never return, they pack their bags and head to Goa.

At Goa, they meet a fellow Tamil named Jack (Aravind Akash), who provides food and shelter and introduces them to the party culture of Goa. Jack also hosts a party which Ramarajan meets Suhashini (Sneha) . Vinay falls in love with Roshini (Piaa Bajpai), a club singer, while Sam attempts to woo an American named Jessica Alba (Melanie Marie), whom he had seen earlier at the wedding in Madurai. The three friends are given a makeover by Jack and Roshini, and they begin a new lifestyle in Goa.

At this point, enters hotelier Daniel (Sampath Raj), who is Jack's lover and a transgender man. Danny is attracted by Sam's innocence and begins making affectionate advances toward him; Sam is oblivious. This invokes the jealousy of Jack, who hires ninja-themed henchmen to beat up Sam. In an awkwardly heroic scene, Sam nullifies their attack.

Ram's life takes a twist after he comes across Suhasini Fernando (Sneha). They begin dating, and Ram learns that she is a wealthy entrepreneur who owns a luxury cruise ship named Casino Royale. The two eventually get married, and Ram gifts her the golden jewel from his village, which she locks in a secret room aboard her yacht. Soon, the trouble starts. Ram learns that Suhasini is slightly neurotic: a fact revealed to him by her former husband Shakthi (Prasanna). The marriage takes a bitter turn, and Ram turns to his friends for help. Together, they plan a covert mission and successfully retrieve the jewel.

Vinay and Sam are successful in their romance. The three boys eventually return to their native village, along with Roshini, Jessica, Danny, and Jack. There, a surprise awaits Ram, in the form of Nayantara. The epilogue takes place in Goa, showing Suhasini falling in love with Madhan Kumar (Silambarasan Rajendar). As they hug, Madhan's nose begins to bleed, indicating that Suhasini has become a victim of Manmadhan.

The film parodies various themes prevalent in Tamil cinema, as well as many popular Tamil songs. Director Venkat Prabhu makes several cameos throughout the film.

Cast 

 Jai as Vinayagam Manickam alias Vinay, a young boy from village ran to Goa with his friends to married foreign girl
 Vaibhav as Ramarajan Ambalavanar alias Ram, an ambitious boy and Vinay's friend from that village
 Premji Amaren as Samikannu alias Sam, the temple  caretaker, timid in nature
 Aravind Akash as Jack, a six-packed gay guy who falls in love with Danny
 Sampath Raj as Daniel 'Danny', Jack's friend / partner
 Piaa Bajpai as Roshini, Vinay's love interest
 Sneha as Suhasini Fernando, divorced lady who marries Ram
 Melanie Marie as Jessica Alba, Sam's love interest
 Chandrasekhar as Manickam, Vinayakam's father and a military man
 Vijayakumar as Nattamai, Ram's father
 Shanmugasundaram as Karagattakkarar, Samikannu's father, a Karagattakam artist
 Anandaraj as Village Rowdy
 Srilekha Rajendran as Ram's mother
 Sathyapriya as Sam's mother
 Ravikanth in many characters, such as a lorry driver, a priest at marriage, casino player, newcomer at village, police officer, custom official, sardarji, and a foreigner
 Kovai Senthil
 Sangeeta Krishnasamy as Jessica's friend (Uncredited role)

Guest appearances (in order of appearance)
 Ajay Raj in "Yellalu Thalamuraikku" Song
 Silambarasan as Manmadhan/Madhan Kumar
 Nayantara as the New Girl in Village
 Prasanna as Shakthi Saravanan, Suhansini's ex-husband
 Venkat Prabhu as Himself
 Vasuki Bhaskar as Herself
 Sakthi Saravanan as Himself
 Silva as Himself
T. Siva as Casino Player
 Bhavatharini as Herself

Production

Development 
Even before the release of his second directorial venture Saroja, director Venkat Prabhu mentioned that he was going to direct his next project very soon: Goa. He also revealed that it would be produced by the famous Hollywood production company Warner Bros. in association with Soundarya Rajinikanth's production company Ocher Studios, who will produce this film, after their maiden venture, the animation film Sultan: The Warrior starring Soundarya's father Rajinikanth, directed by Soundarya herself. The script was first narrated to Rajinikanth; following Rajinikanth's recommendation, his daughter got to listen to the script and she immediately agreed to produce it.

In April 2009, Warner Bros. was said to have backed out of the project, bringing forward the argument that they asked for complete details about the film, including script and expenses. Since the Goa team was not able to do so, because they were running out of time regarding the actors' dates and couldn't provide the details, Warner Bros. opted out. In May 2009, producer Soundarya Rajinikanth denied that Warner Bros. opted out of the project, disclosing that "any rumor that suggests otherwise is simply not true", that Warner Bros. and Ocher Studios have "established a very successful relationship" and that they are still a part of the Goa project.

According to the director, Goa would be a "fun film" and a "jolly good" one like the Hollywood films American Pie and Road Trip. Moreover, it was rumored, that the film was based on a real-life incident, the murder case of the 15-year-old English teenager Scarlett Keeling that happened in Goa in February 2008. However, this plot was not part of the completed film.

Casting 
Following the successes of Chennai 600028 and Saroja, director Venkat Prabhu stated he would continue his trend of introducing new actors and using relatively young actors for his next film. The four lead male characters were announced to be Jai, Aravind Akash, Vaibhav and Premji, with the former two collaborating with Venkat after their roles in Chennai 600028, whilst Vaibhav was a part of Venkat's Saroja. Premji, Venkat's brother, had been a part of both of Venkat's previous ventures and was consequently signed on for a role. Supporting actor Sampath Raj was also signed, renewing his association with Venkat, appearing in his third straight film.

At a press conference in December 2008, Venkat revealed that there would be three lead female roles in the film, one of which would be a non-Indian, "white girl", playing a foreigner in Goa whilst declaring his interest in signing Hollywood actress Jessica Alba with Sneha and Genelia D'Souza. A bound script of the film was sent to Alba who, despite expressing interest to be a part of the project by decreasing her salary from 140 millions to 90 million, was still too costly for the project, since the entire budget of the film was just around 90 million, resulting in Alba's drop out. Denying this, Kartik Gangadharan, chief marketing officer of Ocher Studios, clarified that the reason for Alba's drop out was not the money, which "was not an issue" and "could have been negotiated", but her unavailability and the impossibility of reworking the schedules "around her dates". Since Alba's departure, unsuccessful talks were held with Amanda Seyfried of Mamma Mia! fame, before the role was eventually handed to popular American television actress and model Julie Fine. However Fine, too, was no longer part of the project, as she was surreptitiously replaced by a Swedish actress and model, Nouva Monika Wahlgren, who predominantly works in India, having earlier acted in several Indian films, including Fun Aur Masti and the Shriya Saran-starrer The Other End of the Line. She also appeared in Indian advertisements and who was finally said to be confirmed to play the foreign character. Before Wahlgren was hired, it was reported that an Australian actress, Melanie Marie Jobstreibitzer, was approached and confirmed for the role. Eventually, it turned out, that indeed Melanie Marie was chosen for the role. Early rumors suggested, that the foreign girl would play the murdered Scarlett Keeling, which were later revealed to be fictitious, with the character actually portraying Premji's pair.

Regarding the other two lead female roles, it turned out that discussions with Genelia D'Souza proved to be unsuccessful, with the actress citing she had no available dates until June 2009, having already signed up for a couple of Hindi Language films, whereas talks with Sneha resulted in success as the actress signed on to be a part of the film in late January 2009. It was widely rumored at the time that Sneha's character has negative shades, which would be her first role of this kind. Venkat Prabhu himself, however, revealed that Sneha doesn't have a villainous role as described by the media. The role initially offered to Genelia was subsequently taken over by Pooja. According to reports, Pooja was signed after Preetika Rao, sister of Hindi film actress Amrita Rao, who was supposed to do the role, backed out at last-minute for reasons unknown. In June 2009, however, Piaa Bajpai, who had acted in films like Poi Solla Porom and Aegan earlier, joined the crew, and was said to have replaced Pooja again, who was apparently busy completing her Sinhalese projects. Bajpai's role plays the love interest of Jai.

In November 2009, additionally Nayantara was hired for a cameo appearance in the last scene of the film. Reports indicated that she shot for the scene, involving herself and the lead cast, for one day without taking any remuneration as she was a "big fan of Venkat Prabhu's movies".

The technical crew remained mostly the same as in Venkat Prabhu's earlier ventures. His cousin Yuvan Shankar Raja composes the musical score, whereas his songs featured lyrics provided by veterans 'Kavignar' Vaali and Gangai Amaran. Sakthi Saravanan, Videsh and Vasuki Bhaskar were signed as the cinematographer, art director and costume designer, respectively, joining Venkat Prabhu for the third time in his third venture. Praveen K. L. and Srikanth N. B. were selected to edit the film, whilst dance moves were choreographed by Kalyan again, who is joined by Ajay Raj and Saravana Rajan. Whilst the former had worked with Venkat Prabhu in his debut venture, Chennai 600028, the latter was part of Prabhu's second film, Saroja. Kalyan was a choreographer in all Venkat Prabhu films.

Filming 
Before starting the filming, a photo shoot of the film was held in the "City studio" in the last week of February 2009, featuring Sneha and Premji. The shooting was slated to start on 11 March 2009 but had to be postponed, because of the complaint lodged against actor Jai at the Tamil Film Producers council, who had stated that some of his forthcoming films would flop at the box office. Producer Soundarya Rajinikanth is said to have approached the council and requested to lift the ban, explaining the loss due to the ban, after which the ban on Jai was revoked and the filming started.

The first schedule of film shooting was held in Theni, Pannaipuram and surrounding places in Theni district in Tamil Nadu. It included a folk song, which is said to be the introduction song and which was shot from 31 March 2009 onwards in Goa featuring Jai, Vaibhav, Aravind Akash, Premji and Sneha, along with Ajay Raj, who choreographs the song, Payal and around 500 Goans.

The second schedule, lasting 40 days, was completely shot in Goa itself, which featured only the male lead actors: Jai, Vaibhav and Premji Amaran. It was completed in mid-June, after which the crew returned to Chennai. The third and last schedule was shot from 5 July onwards on the Langkawi Islands, an archipelago of around 100 small islands in the Andaman Sea, which belongs to Malaysia, where many popular Tamil and Hindi film were shot. Though initially Venkat Prabhu had wanted to complete the remaining parts of the film in Goa as well, he eventually had to move to Langkawi, because of the monsoon season that had set in heavy rains, affecting the west coastal area of India. He chose Langkawi as it has "very similar locations and looks" to Goa and has a very good climate. It was reported that music director Yuvan Shankar Raja would perform one of the songs himself live on the beaches there. In late 2009, two more songs were filmed in Kerala and Goa itself, with which the film's shooting was completed.

Soundtrack 

The film score and soundtrack for Goa are composed by Venkat Prabhu's cousin and regular music composer, Yuvan Shankar Raja. Since approximately the first twenty minutes of the film are set in the 1980s, it is known that the music for the affected scenes and a couple of the songs were recorded live (as it was done during that time) to "do justice to the scenes". Yuvan Shankar Raja had started the re-recording works for the film score on 21 December 2009, after having watched the entire film and had finished it within seven days with the help of his cousin and assistant Premji Amaran.

The soundtrack, after several postponements, was finally released on 6 January 2010. The album features 9 songs overall. 18 singers have lent their voices for the songs, including composer Yuvan Shankar Raja, his father Ilaiyaraaja, his siblings Karthik Raja and Bhavatharini, his cousins Premji Amaran and director Venkat Prabhu, S. P. Balasubrahmanyam, K. S. Chitra and actress-singer Mamta Mohandas.

Contrary to earlier reports that suggested that merely three or four numbers would feature in the film, seven out of the nine songs were used in their entirety, besides two more additional tracks.

Release
The satellite rights of the film were sold to Sun TV. The film was given an "A" certificate by the Indian Censor Board., reportedly because of its content that "requires a mature audience", while also describing it as a "path breaking entertainer which explores human sexuality very beautifully". The film released with over 200 prints in Tamil Nadu. The film's release, initially expected to happen in late 2009, got postponed several times. It was released on 29 January 2010 worldwide with Thamizh Padam and the controversial Jaggubhai.

Reception
The film opened to mostly positive reviews especially from the youth, who were Venkat Prabhu's target. But critics has mixed reviews at best, with some commenting that the second half seems rushed and was made to resemble a mix between a casino caper and a comedy film. On the opening weekend, it collected 11.2 million at Chennai alone. The movie showed highly positive return and initially topped at the box office collections before becoming an average grosser.

Awards and nominations

References

External links 
 

2010 films
Ocher Studios films
2010 romantic comedy films
Indian teen comedy films
Films set in Goa
Indian LGBT-related films
Films scored by Yuvan Shankar Raja
Films directed by Venkat Prabhu
2010s Tamil-language films
Films shot in Goa
Indian romantic comedy films
Indian sex comedy films
Indian coming-of-age films
Tamil films remade in other languages
Films set on beaches
Films set in Theni
Films set in Madurai
Films shot in Madurai